Rémy Descamps (born 25 June 1996) is a French professional footballer who plays as a goalkeeper for Ligue 1 club Nantes.

Career

Paris Saint-Germain 
Descamps joined the Paris Saint-Germain Youth Academy in 2013. In 2016, he reached the UEFA Youth League final with the club’s U19 side. Descamps signed his first professional contract with the Paris Saint-Germain senior side in May 2016.

In January 2018, Descamps was loaned to Ligue 2 side Tours. He made his debut for Tours in a 2–1 Coupe de France away win to Chartres on 6 January 2018, playing the full 90 minutes. During his loan spell, he made 21 appearances for the club in all competitions.On 21 August 2018, Descamps signed a three-year contract extension with Paris Saint-Germain, before being loaned to Clermont for a season without an option to buy.

Charleroi 
In August 2019, Descamps signed for Charleroi, replacing Rémy Riou, who was transferred away to Caen.

Nantes 
On 23 June 2021, Descamps joined returned to France to sign for Ligue 1 club Nantes. He penned a three-year deal at the club.

Career statistics

Honours 
Paris Saint-Germain U19
 Championnat National U19: 2015–16
 UEFA Youth League runner-up: 2015–16

Nantes
Coupe de France: 2021–22

References

External links
 
 
 
 

1996 births
Living people
Association football goalkeepers
French footballers
Lille OSC players
Tarbes Pyrénées Football players
Clermont Foot players
Paris Saint-Germain F.C. players
Tours FC players
R. Charleroi S.C. players
FC Nantes players
Ligue 2 players
Championnat National 2 players
Championnat National 3 players
Belgian Pro League players
French expatriate footballers
French expatriate sportspeople in Belgium
Expatriate footballers in Belgium
Footballers from Lille